Turriplicifer is a genus of sea snails, marine gastropod mollusks, in the family Costellariidae, the ribbed miters.

Species
Species within the genus Turriplicifer include:
 Turriplicifer apicitinctus (Verco, 1896)
 Turriplicifer australis (Swainson, 1820)
 Turriplicifer esperancensis (Marrow, 2013)

References

Costellariidae
Monotypic gastropod genera